The Electrifying Eddie Harris is an album by American jazz saxophonist Eddie Harris recorded in 1967 and released on the Atlantic label.

Reception
The Allmusic review states "This is one of tenor saxophonist Eddie Harris' most famous and significant LPs... A classic date".

Track listing
All compositions by Eddie Harris except as indicated
 "Theme in Search of a Movie" (Charles Stepney) - 4:06 
 "Listen Here" - 7:42 
 "Judie's Theme" (Melvin Jackson) - 4:40 
 "Sham Time" - 6:50 
 "Spanish Bull" - 8:18 
 "I Don't Want No One But You" - 3:41 
Recorded in New York City on March 20, 1967

Personnel
Eddie Harris - tenor saxophone, varitone
Melvin Lastie, Joe Newman - trumpet (track 4) 
King Curtis - tenor saxophone (track 4)
David Newman - tenor saxophone, baritone saxophone (track 4)
Haywood Henry - baritone saxophone (track 4)
Jodie Christian - piano
Melvin Jackson - bass 
Richard Smith - drums
Ray Barretto, Joe Wohletz - percussion (tracks 2 & 5)
Unnamed string section (track 1)
Arif Mardin - arranger (tracks 1 & 4)

References 

Eddie Harris albums
1968 albums
Albums produced by Arif Mardin
Albums arranged by Arif Mardin
Atlantic Records albums